Jorge Montenegro may refer to:

 Jorge Montenegro (shot putter) (born 1968), Cuban shot putter
 Jorge Luis Montenegro (born 1988), Ecuadorian cyclist
 Jorge Martín Montenegro  (born 1983), Argentine cyclist